Banswada Assembly constituency is a constituency of Telangana Legislative Assembly, India. It is one of constituencies of Telangana with 9 mandals out of which 6 mandals (Varni, Chandur, Mosra, Kotagiri, Pothangal & Rudrur) are in  Nizamabad district and other 3 mandals (Banswada, Birkur, Nasrullabad) in Kamareddy district. It is part of Zahirabad Lok Sabha constituency.

Pocharam Srinivas Reddy of Telangana Rashtra Samithi is currently representing the constituency.

Mandals
The Assembly Constituency presently comprises the following Mandals:

Members of Legislative Assembly

Election results

Telangana Legislative Assembly election, 2018

Telangana Legislative Assembly election, 2014

See also
 List of constituencies of Telangana Legislative Assembly

References

Assembly constituencies of Telangana
Kamareddy district